Bill Fontana (born April 25, 1947 in Cleveland, Ohio) is known internationally for his pioneering experiments in sound art.

Life and career
Fontana attended the New School for Social Research in New York and studied both music and philosophy. He traveled to Australia, and also stayed in Japan and Germany composing. Fontana began making sound sculptures in 1976. In a career spanning 40 years, Fontana's sound sculptures use the urban environment as a living source of musical information, all with the potential to conjure up visual imagery in the mind of the listener. He has made works all over the world and has presented his sound sculptures extensively, including at the Venice Biennale (1999), the Museo Reina Sofia, Madrid (1995), The Whitney Museum of American Art, New York (1991), Tate Modern, London (2006), Madison Square Park, New York (2007), and the San Francisco Museum of Modern Art (1987, 1997, 2010). Some of his more famous works include Distant Trains, Satellite Ear Bridge Cologne-San Francisco, Journey Through My Sound Sculptures, The Sound of an Unblown Flute, Panoramic Echoes and "Acoustical Visions of the Golden Gate Bridge" In 2005, Fontana was an Artadia Awardee. Fontana recently won the Prix Ars Electronica Collide@CERN Prize, 2012–2013 where is developing a sound sculpture at CERN in Geneva called "Acoustic Time Travel" to be realized in September 2014 for the 60th Anniversary of CERN.

References

External links
 Bill Fontana's website
 Work in the San Francisco Museum of Modern Art collection
 SFMOMA Bay Area Treasure Award
 San Jose Mercury article
 Bill Fontana's musical sculptures
 Bill Fontana biography on Media Art Net

20th-century classical composers
American male classical composers
American classical composers
21st-century classical composers
Living people
1947 births
American sound artists
Artists from the San Francisco Bay Area
Artists from Cleveland
21st-century American composers
20th-century American composers
20th-century American male musicians
21st-century American male musicians
American people of Italian descent